Petra Langrová and Helena Suková were the defending champions, but Suková did not compete this year. Langrová teamed up with Sandrine Testud and lost in the semifinals to Rachel McQuillan and Noëlle van Lottum.

Sandra Cecchini and Patricia Tarabini won the title by defeating McQuillan and van Lottum 7–5, 6–1 in the final.

Seeds

Draw

Draw

References

External links
 Official results archive (ITF)
 Official results archive (WTA)

Clarins Open
1992 WTA Tour